Strange Alibi is a 1941 American crime film directed by D. Ross Lederman, written by Kenneth Gamet, Leslie T. White and Fred Niblo Jr., and starring Arthur Kennedy, Joan Perry, Jonathan Hale, John Ridgely, Florence Bates and Charles Trowbridge. It was released by Warner Bros. on April 19, 1941.

Plot
After a witness is shot and a suspect hanged in a jail cell, Police Chief Sprague decides to send Sgt. Joe Geary undercover, looking for a mysterious crime-syndicate boss responsible for ordering these murders. A story is planted by the chief that Geary is being suspended from the force, in order to help him infiltrate the mob.

Geary discovers that a police captain is the criminal mastermind. Sprague is killed, though, and Geary framed when nobody believes his story about being undercover. While jailed, his fiancée Alice Devlin works to clear his name. Geary breaks out of jail and personally goes to the reform-minded governor to prove his innocence.

Cast
 Arthur Kennedy as Sergeant Joe Geary
 Joan Perry as Alice Devlin
 Jonathan Hale as Police Chief Sprague
 John Ridgely as Tex Alexander
 Florence Bates as Katie
 Charles Trowbridge as Governor Phelps
 Cliff Clark as Police Captain Reddick
 Stanley Andrews as Lieutenant-Detective Pagle
 Howard Da Silva as Monson
 Wade Boteler as Police Captain Allen
 Ben Welden as Durkin
 Joe Downing as Benny McKaye
 Dick Rich as Big Dog
 Paul Phillips as Crips Vossen
 Joe King as Warden Morrell
 Paul Stanton as Prosecutor

References

External links
 

1941 films
1941 crime films
American crime films
American black-and-white films
1940s English-language films
Films directed by D. Ross Lederman
Warner Bros. films
1940s American films